Alcopop! Records is a British independent record label, run by Jack Clothier and Kevin Douch formed in 2006 when the pair lived together in East Oxford. The label works with the likes of DZ Deathrays, Johnny Foreigner, Fight Like Apes, Anamanaguchi, Peaness, TIGERCUB, Gaffa Tape Sandy, The Spook School, Nelson Can, and QI.

Inception
Alcopop! Records was formally created after a small loan was gambled on the Charlton vs Portsmouth match of 16 September 2006, with money for the first release and show generated from a successful bet on the match. This money was invested in a band from Yeovil called Encyclopedia, with the first single "Emily" (Alcopop001) kicking off the 2006/7 singles club (which also included the likes of Midget, data.select.party and 4 or 5 Magicians). Founder Jack pOp, in a recent interview with the Complete Music Update website, said "Alcopop! was born back in 2006 with a three figure loan from my Dad and a fuzzy idea to mix up some classic 90s indie and some awesome new stuff and – via a series of handmade, special three-inch CDs – do our bit to prove that physical music wasn’t dead. We got drunk, bet a large chunk of the money on a football match, and Congolese striker Lomana LuaLua ensured that we had enough cash to get going!"

Alcopop! anti-UKIP controversy 
In 2015, Alcopop! stepped in after a hacker cancelled the United Kingdom Independence Party (UKIP) website contract and temporarily purchased the UKIP website. Claiming they’d fill the website with multi-coloured unicorns or donate the website to a pro-immigration agency, the website nevertheless was soon forcibly recovered and returned to the political party by provider GoDaddy. UKIP later blamed 'gremlins in the system'. Alcopop! then proceeded to collaborate with Shikari Sound System to release 7" record "The Wit and Wisdom of Nigel Farage" which was, of course, completely silent. The release profits went to Migrants Rights Network and was in homage to a similar stunt by Stiff Records against Ronald Reagan.

Alcopop! interesting formats
As well as operating more standard album and EP releases on CD and vinyl, Alcopop! Records prides itself on releasing through a host of different formats, and has put out singles and EPs on the likes of frisbees (Johnny Foreigner Certain Songs are Cursed EP), scarves (My First Tooth Sleet and Snow EP), bespoke watches (Gunning for Tamar Time Trophies EP) and a Minidisc (Stagecoach – Say Hi to the Band). When asked about motivation for producing these different formats in a recent interview, Jack pOp stated "For me the it’s more than what is on that record… It’s about the experience from the moment you get it, how the artwork makes you feel, being able to show it to friends – the anticipation of dropping the needle/ pressing the play button… I genuinely love it."

In 2014 Alcopop! re-released the hit song "Steal My Sunshine" on cassette with co-founders Jack and Kev drawn into the re-imagined sleeve alongside some of the original cast.

Other notable releases
Alcopop! were the first label in the UK to release a podcast on vinyl, collaborating with the QI Elves to put out a special edition of their 'No Such Thing As A Fish' podcast on vinyl – which came with 52 episodes of the podcast on the download card. The record included a bonus track from Corey Taylor of Slipknot fame on the B-side.

Working with Brighton grunge band TIGERCUB in 2017, Alcopop! put out the world's first Pay What You Want 12" vinyl. Preceded by a physical mailout campaign to all existing fans of the band, the original pressing sold out within 24 hours and was considered a success by singer Jamie Hall, who stated "We were worried people wouldn’t give a shit, but it quickly turned into fucking Wikileaks. It escalated fast. We fucking sold out of 'em all pretty much before we went public, so we had to put up a second pressing pre-sale for people who missed out, which is now about to sell out too.

To try to capitalise on the spirit of indie and rally against over-priced reissues at Record Store Day, Alcopop! put out Sensible Record Labels vol 1. and 2 on RSD in 2015 and 2016. RRP’d at £10, featuring 11 songs from independent labels with hundreds of songs on the download card, each release sold out on the day. Tim Dellow, founder of Transgressive Records, said of Volume 1 "We’re thrilled to be involved in something that genuinely captures the true spirit of Record Store Day, and what this community of great independent artists and labels represent. A great value way for fans to get into new bands across all the labels, and support their local indie store. Good on Alcopop!”

Alcopop! gained a reputation for their 'Alcopopular' compilation series. The series has even been branded 'The coolest compilation ever' by NME. Alcopopular has been released as a bike, a 3" CD, a cassette tape, a message in a bottle, a restaurant menu and fold out 'Hithikers Guide to the UK'. Loud and Quiet suggested "We need labels like Alcopop to offer us something a little out of the ordinary. There’s no character in a bunch of mega bites but there’s a hell of a lot in a bottle containing a modern day pirate treasure map that leads you to some audio booty."

Awards and honours
Alcopop! Records were named as the best small label at the AIM Awards 2013, after being nominated in 2012.

Alcopop! were also voted as the best record label in the UK at the Punktastic Reader Awards in 2012.

Active roster
Anamanaguchi
Art Brut
Best Ex
Cheekface
Cherym
DITZ
DZ Deathrays
El Ten Eleven
False Advertising
Fight Like Apes
Gaffa Tape Sandy
Happy Accidents
Helen Love
Hellogoodbye
itoldyouiwouldeatyou
Johnny Foreigner
Kississippi
Nelson Can
No Such Thing as a Fish
Peaness
The QI Elves
Snow Coats
The Spook School
Tellison
TIGERCUB
Tokky Horror
Weirds

Past roster
Stagecoach
Hush The Many
Get Cape. Wear Cape. Fly
The Crimea
Matt Pryor
Freeze The Atlantic
Brawlers
OhBoy!
Emperor Yes
Gunning For Tamar
LightGuides
Ute
Jumping Ships
Oh No! Yoko
Acres of Lions
Screaming Maldini
Sam Isaac
This City
Pavilion
Elephants
The Candle Thieves
Wolf Am I
Stars & Sons
GoFaster
Cut The Blue Wire
The Family Machine
4 or 5 Magicians
Lucy and the Caterpillar
Nathaniel Green
Data.Select.Party
Encyclopedia
The Social Club
Radstewart
Bear Cavalry
The Attika State
Acollective
Katie Malco
Doctrines
Her Parents
My First Tooth
The Spills
Get Inuit

References

External links

Underground punk scene in the United Kingdom
British independent record labels
Record labels established in 2006
Alternative rock record labels
Rock record labels
Pop record labels
British companies established in 2006
2006 establishments in England
Companies based in Oxford